Chris Tuck (born July 9, 1966) is a Democratic member of the Alaska House of Representatives, representing the 23rd District in Anchorage since 2008. He serves as the Majority Leader of the Alaska Independent Democratic Coalition. Previously, Tuck served on the Anchorage School Board.  Tuck had run unsuccessfully for the State House in 2004 and 2006 before winning election in 2008.

References

External links
 Alaska State Legislature – Representative Chris Tuck official government website
 Project Vote Smart – Representative Chris Tuck (AK) profile
 Follow the Money – Chris Tuck
 campaign contributions
 Alaska's Democratic Caucus – Chris Tuck profile
 Chris Tuck at 100 Years of Alaska's Legislature

|-

1966 births
21st-century American politicians
Democratic Party members of the Alaska House of Representatives
Living people
People from Taft, California
Politicians from Anchorage, Alaska
School board members in Alaska